Kevin Cook is an American businessman, software engineer, and politician serving as a member of the Idaho Senate from the 30th district. He assumed office on December 1, 2020.

Early life and education 
Cook was born in Spanish Fork, Utah. He earned a Bachelor of Science degree in computer science from Weber State University.

Career 
Cook worked as a software engineer for the Idaho National Laboratory. He then operated his own software consulting business for 12 years. Cook was elected to the Idaho Senate in November 2020. He assumed office on December 1, 2020.

References 

Republican Party Idaho state senators
Living people
People from Spanish Fork, Utah
Weber State University alumni
Year of birth missing (living people)